The Kangaroo River is a perennial river of the Shoalhaven catchment located in the Southern Highlands and Illawarra regions of New South Wales, Australia.

The Kangaroo River, in Kangaroo Valley, is one of the few rivers that flows west before joining the Shoalhaven river to flow out to the sea.

Location and features
It initially flows in a north-westerly direction to Carrington Falls, where the river crosses the western escarpment of the Budderoo Plateau. The river then turns to the south-west and flows through the communities of Upper Kangaroo Valley and Kangaroo Valley, and into the Morton National Park. The river ends its course by flowing into Lake Yarrunga, a reservoir formed by the Tallowa Dam and situated just downstream of the confluence of the Shoalhaven and Kangaroo rivers. The river descends  over its  course.

The river is crossed by the historic Hampden Bridge in the town of Kangaroo Valley.

See also

 Fitzroy Falls
 
 List of rivers in New South Wales (A-K)
 Morton National Park
 Rivers of New South Wales
 Shoalhaven Scheme

References

Rivers of New South Wales
Southern Highlands (New South Wales)
Shoalhaven River